Jenno Berckmoes (born 4 February 2001) is a Belgian racing cyclist, who currently rides for UCI ProTeam .

Major results
2019
 8th Johan Museeuw Classic
2021
 1st Overall Tour de Namur
1st Stages 3 & 4 (ITT)
2022
 10th Road race, UCI Road World Under-23 Championships
2023
 4th Grand Prix La Marseillaise

References

External links

2001 births
Living people
Belgian male cyclists
Sportspeople from Ghent
Cyclists from East Flanders
21st-century Belgian people